Drex Zamboanga (born 17 April 1993) is a Filipino mixed martial artist who competes in the bantamweight and lightweight division of ONE Championship. He has previously competed in ONE's Flyweight division.

Zamboanga has also competed for Universal Reality Combat Championship, where he is a former URCC Bantamweight Champion.

Background 
Zamboanga was born and raised in Quezon City, Philippines. He started martial arts by training in karate at the age of 14 with his sister Denice.

Zamboanga has won titles in various competitions, including Brazilian jiu-jitsu, wrestling and boxing, and has also gained a black belt in karate.

Mixed martial arts career

Universal Reality Combat Championship
Zamboanga officially began professionally competing in mixed martial arts in 2013, beginning his career in Universal Reality Combat Championship.
 
On April 27, 2019, he won the URCC bantamweight championship by stopping Seung Hyun Cho.

ONE Championship
On 28 August 2020, he successfully made his ONE Championship debut with a second-round submission over Detchadin Sorsirisuphathin at ONE Championship: A New Breed.

For his next fight, Drex moved up two weight classes from Flyweight to Lightweight to face Rahul Raju. On February 25, 2022, he knocked out Rahul Raju in the first round at ONE: Full Circle.

Zamboanga faced ONE Warrior Series: Philippines winner Adonis Sevilleno on December 3, 2022, at ONE 164. He won the bout via unanimous decision.

Championships and accomplishments
Universal Reality Combat Championship 
URCC Bantamweight Champion (One time)

Mixed martial arts record 

|-
|Win
|align=center|11–5
|Adonis Sevilleno
|Decision (unanimous)
|ONE 164
|
| align=center|3
| align=center|5:00
| Pasay, Philippines 
| 
|-
|Win
|align=center|10–5
| Rahul Raju
| KO (punches)
| ONE: Full Circle
| 
| align=center|1
| align=center|1:05
| Kallang, Singapore
|   
|-
|Win
|align=center|9–5
| Detchadin Sorsirisuphathin
| Technical Submission (rear naked choke)
| ONE Championship: A New Breed
| 
| align=center|2
| align=center|4:58
| Bangkok, Thailand
|  
|-
|Win
|align=center|8–5
| Seung Hyun Cho
| TKO (doctor stoppage)
| URCC 77: Raw Fury
| 
| align=center|3
| align=center|5:00
| Manila, Philippines
| 
|-
|Loss
|align=center|7–5
| Keita Ishibashi
| Decision (unanimous)
| Shooto in Korakuen Hall
| 
| align=center|3
| align=center|5:00
| Tokyo, Japan
| 
|-
|Loss
|align=center|7–4
| Gi Bum Moon
| TKO (punches)
| Angel's Fighting 7
| 
| align=center|3
| align=center|2:04
| Seoul, South Korea
| 
|-
|Loss
|align=center|7–3
| Yutaka Saito
| TKO (punches) 
| Shooto Korakuen Hall 3/25
| 
| align=center|3
| align=center|4:58
| Tokyo, Japan
| 
|-
|Win
|align=center|7–2
| Rex De Lara
| TKO (punches)
| URCC Bets 3
| 
| align=center|3
| align=center|N/A
| Manila, Philippines
| 
|-
|Win
|align=center|6–2
| Sem Bicaldo
| Submission (rear naked choke)
| URCC 28: Vindication
| 
| align=center|1
| align=center|4:01
| Manila, Philippines
| 
|-
|Win
|align=center|5–2
| Dennis Domingo
| Submission (rear naked choke)
| URCC 27: Rebellion
| 
| align=center|1
| align=center|N/A
| Manila, Philippines
| 
|-
|Win
|align=center|4–2
| Renato Jabiniao
| TKO (corner stoppage)
| The Proving Grounds 5: Retribution
| 
| align=center|3
| align=center|N/A
| Cagayan de Oro, Philippines
| 
|-
|Loss
|align=center|3–2
| Do Gyeom Lee
| KO
| URCC 26: Domination
| 
| align=center|2
| align=center|N/A
| Angeles, Philippines
| 
|-
|Win
|align=center|3–1
| John Oliver
| TKO
| URCC: Camsur
| 
| align=center|
| align=center|
| Pili, Philippines
| 
|-
|Win
|align=center|2–1
| Joseph Mercado
| Decision (unanimous)
| URCC 25: Takeover
| 
| align=center|3
| align=center|5:00 
| Pasay, Philippines
| 
|-
|Win
|align=center|1–1
| Ramonito Pabroa
| Submission
| URCC: Fight Night 1
| 
| align=center|1
| align=center|N/A
| Manila, Philippines
| 
|-
|Loss
|align=center|0–1
| Hideo Morikawa
| Submission (heel hook) 
| URCC / Tribal Gear: Dutdutan Tattoo Festival 2013
| 
| align=center|1
| align=center|N/A
| Manila, Philippines
| 
|-

See also 

 List of current mixed martial arts champions
 Universal Reality Combat Championship
 List of male mixed martial artists
 List of current ONE fighters
 2020 in ONE Championship
 2022 in ONE Championship

Notes

References

External links 

 Drex Zamboanga at ONE
 
 
 

1993 births
Living people
Filipino male mixed martial artists
Filipino male karateka
Filipino practitioners of Brazilian jiu-jitsu
Lightweight mixed martial artists
Mixed martial artists utilizing karate
Mixed martial artists utilizing boxing
Mixed martial artists utilizing wrestling
Mixed martial artists utilizing Brazilian jiu-jitsu
People from Quezon City